Common lady's mantle is a common name for several plants and may refer to:

Alchemilla mollis
Alchemilla vulgaris
Clitoria ternatea